David Marsden is a Canadian radio broadcaster.

David Marsden may also refer to:
C. David Marsden (1938–1998), British neuroscientist
David W. Marsden (born 1948), American politician
David Marsden, a character in Cold Feet